Avalude Ravukal is a 1978 Indian Malayalam-language drama film directed by I. V. Sasi and written by A. Sheriff. The film explores the life of Raji (Seema), a teenage prostitute and those of the people around her. Upon release, the film received less audience in the first three days but the situation changed in the coming days and it became one of the highest-grossing films of the year.

It is considered one of the boldest Malayalam films of all time. Sasi, the experimental and the most popular director at that time, tried to highlight a theme which most mainstream directors are afraid to get into. Kamal Haasan and I. V. Sasi made guest appearances in the film. The film was dubbed and released in Tamil as Avalin Iravugal and in Hindi as Her Nights and were also successful at the box office. It was remade in Kannada as Kamala (1979) and in Hindi as Patita (1980).

Plot 
The story pivots around Raji, a young prostitute, and three young men in her life: Two college-going youngsters, Babu, Jayan and a school teacher Chandran.

Raji loses her parents early in her life, leaving the responsibility of bringing up her younger brother Sudhakaran on her shoulders. Circumstances and her unskilled status force her into the life of a prostitute. She begins living in a slum with Mariyaamma Chedathi and a cycle-rickshaw driver Damu, her 'agent' or pimp.

Babu is a student who stays in a nearby hostel. Raji falls for Babu and becomes a regular visitor at his flat, even though he, afraid for his reputation, repeatedly tries to throw her out. Raji's declares her love for Babu but says that she does not want to have sexual relations with him, as then he would be like another customer. However, she cajoles him into letting her sleep at his place on the floor, gently refusing his romantic overtures. News spreads about Babu's relationship with Raji, assumed falsely to be that of a customer and prostitute.

Raji's brother Sudhakaran has a teacher-student relationship with Chandran. One day a beggar steals Chandran's wrist watch through an open window. Sudhakaran is arrested by the police, because he is a regular at Chandran's room, and is the immediate suspect. He is beaten up by the cops in police custody and dies from the physical trauma after his release. The real thief is later arrested; Chandran is uneasy about it and whether his hasty judgement resulted in the boy's loss of life. From remorse, Chandran offers money to Raji, but she refuses to accept it or forgive him in any manner.

Babus's father, Karunakaran, decides to have his son marry his wife Lakshmi's brother's daughter, Damodaran's daughter Radha. Karunakaran, Damodaran, and Radha visit Babu's hostel room and are shocked to see Raji in there, who, as usual, was just there to talk to Babu and be with him. They, of course, assume that the two are sleeping together. Damodaran, ashamed and angered, breaks off the engagement and has Radha marry another man.

Jayan, who had had a severe drinking problem, dies of liver-related complications. On his death bed he asks Babu to not abandon Raji and emphasises it with the justification that her love for him is pure, even if its 'impure' in the eyes of society. Raji is gang-raped and Chandran's timely intervention saves her; Raji then finally begins to forgive Chandran.

Babu's mother believes her son's denials of impropriety with Raji, and comes to meet Babu and eventually Raji. She takes pity on Raji when she learns of her past and her son's blind love for her. Lakshmi accepts her as her daughter-in-law and takes her home, and eventually Babu's father is also forced to accept Raji as his daughter-in-law.

Cast 

 Seema as Raji
 Ravikumar as Babu
 M. G. Soman as Chandran
 Sukumaran as Jayan
 Bahadoor as Karunakaran
 Sankaradi as Damodaran
 Kaviyoor Ponnamma as Lakshmi
 Usharani as Radha
 Kuthiravattam Pappu as Damu
 Meena as Mariyaamma Chedathi
 Master Raghu as Sudhakaran
 Sathaar as a Police Inspector
 Kamal Haasan (guest appearance)
 I. V. Sasi (guest appearance)

Production 
The film was produced by M. P. Ramachandran under the banner of Murali Movies. The film story, script and dialogues were written by A. Sheriff. Vipindas was the man behind the camera and K. Narayanan edited the film. This film was shot in black-and-white.

Soundtrack 
The music was composed by A. T. Ummer and the lyrics were written by Bichu Thirumala. Guna Singh composed the background score. Music for the song "Raagendu Kiranangal" was allegedly copied from the song "Pal Bhar Mein Yeh Kya Ho" in the film Swami released in 1977.

Release and reception 
Avalude Ravukal was released on 3 March 1978. It was given an "A" (adult) certificate by the Central Board of Film Certification. The film was distributed by S. Pavamani under the banner of Sithara Pictures. The film was dubbed and released in Tamil as Avalin Iravugal and in Hindi as Her Nights and were also successful at the box office. Avalude Ravukal was remade in Hindi as Patita (1980), also directed by I. V. Sasi. The film has over the years devoleped into cult film. B. Vijayakumar of The Hindu wrote that the film was "Remembered for the social movie with a strong message and good music".

References

External links 
 

1970s Malayalam-language films
1978 drama films
1978 films
Films about prostitution in India
Films with screenplays by Alleppey Sheriff
Indian black-and-white films
Indian drama films
Films shot in Kozhikode
Malayalam films remade in other languages
Films directed by I. V. Sasi